Arceuthobium siskiyouense is a species of dwarf mistletoe known as knobcone pine dwarf mistletoe. It is endemic to the Klamath Mountains of northern California and southern Oregon, where it lives as a parasite on knobcone pine trees. This is a brownish shrub which is visible as a network of scaly stems extending above the bark of its host tree. Most of the mistletoe is located inside the host tree, attached to it via haustoria, which tap the tree for water and nutrients. The leaves of the mistletoe are reduced to scales on its surface.

References
Hawksworth, F. G., D. Wiens, and D. L. Nickrent. (1992). New Western North American taxa of Arceuthobium (Viscaceae). Novon 2:3 204–11.

External links
Jepson Manual Treatment

siskiyouense
Flora of California
Flora of Oregon
Plants described in 1992
Flora without expected TNC conservation status